In civil engineering, the invert level is the base interior level of a pipe, trench or tunnel; it can be considered the "floor" level. The invert is an important datum for determining the functioning or flowline of a piping system. For example, the invert of a street sewer connection could affect the feasibility of adding a toilet in the basement of a house. 

Conversely, the obvert level is the highest interior level, and can be considered the "ceiling" level, being the highest level of that sewer. 

The bottom of the sewer is called the invert from a general resemblance in construction to an "inverted" arch. An inverted arch is rounded structure with its crown facing in the downward position. This is a common term in structural architect drawings.

Invert Level is found through measuring the distance from the lowest level of a pipe, to a fixed datum. A pipe laser, or another vertical distance measuring device is most commonly used for this.  Invert levels are important for the drainage of a non-pressured fluid pipe. The invert level of the pipe will be lower for each section of pipe before it reaches its final destination.

Many common types of pipe have pipe sections with a male and female end. These are sometimes known as the spigot and bell ends. The spigot end will fit inside the bell end of the next pipe section. It is important to know which one of these you are referring to because this will change the desired results of what you are measuring. Measurement should be taken from the bottom of the bell end. This will be the lowest point of the pipe, and also where the water will flow.

Corrugated pipe will be measured differently than a smooth wall pipe. When trying to find the invert level of a corrugated pipe, you will want to use the ridge on the inside of the pipe as water will fill up the grooves before it will allow for a steady flow down the pipe. The diameter of the ridge on the inside of the pipe will also be the nominal value of the pipe.

References

Drainage
Hydraulic engineering
Tunnels